Mae Schmidle (June 8, 1926 – April 26, 2019) was an American politician.

Biography
Schmidle was born in Bridgeport, Connecticut, She lived in Newtown, Connecticut with her husband and family and was involved with the Newtown Parent Teacher Association. Schmidle served as the president of the Connecticut State Parent Teacher Association. She served as the Newtown town clerk. Schmidle served in the Connecticut House of Representatives from 1981 to 1991 and was a Republican. Schmidle died at her home in Newtown, Connecticut.

Notes

1926 births
2019 deaths
Politicians from Bridgeport, Connecticut
People from Newtown, Connecticut
Women state legislators in Connecticut
Republican Party members of the Connecticut House of Representatives
20th-century American politicians
20th-century American women politicians
Activists from Connecticut
21st-century American women